Brdice pri Neblem is a small settlement northwest of Dobrovo near Neblo in the Municipality of Brda in the Littoral region of Slovenia.

References

External links
Brdice pri Neblem on Geopedia

Populated places in the Municipality of Brda